The Open Féminin de Marseille (previously known as Open GDF Suez de Marseille) was a tournament for professional female tennis players played on outdoor clay courts. The event was classified as a $100,000 ITF Women's Circuit tournament. It was held annually in Marseille, France, from 1997 to 2017 (with the exception of 1998). The name was changed from Open GDF Suez de Marseille to Open Féminin de Marseille in 2013.

Past finals

Singles

Doubles

External links 
 
 ITF search

ITF Women's World Tennis Tour
Clay court tennis tournaments
Recurring sporting events established in 1997
Recurring sporting events disestablished in 2017
Defunct tennis tournaments in France